Amino acid N-carboxyanhydrides, also called Leuchs' anhydrides, are a family of heterocyclic organic compounds derived from amino acids. They are white, moisture-reactive solids.  They have been evaluated for applications the field of biomaterials.

Preparation 

NCAs are typically prepared by phosgenation of amino acids:

They were first synthesized by Hermann Leuchs by heating an N-ethoxycarbonyl or N-methoxycarbonyl amino acid chloride in a vacuum at 50-70 °C:

A moisture-tolerant route to unprotected NCAs employs epoxides as scavengers of hydrogen chloride.

The relatively high temperatures necessary for this cyclization results in the decomposition of several NCAs. Of several improvements, one notable procedure involves treating an unprotected amino acid with phosgene or its trimer.

Reactions
NCAs are prone to hydrolysis to the parent amino acid:
RCHNHC(O)OC(O) + H2O → H2NCH(R)CO2H + CO2
Some derivatives however tolerate water briefly.

NCAs convert to homopolypeptides ( [N(H)CH(R)CO)]n) through ring-opening polymerization:
nRCHNHC(O)OC(O) → [N(H)CH(R)CO)]n + nCO2

Poly-L-lysine has been prepared from N-carbobenzyloxy-α-N-carboxy-L-lysine anhydride, followed by deprotection with phosphonium iodide. Peptide synthesis from NCAs does not require protection of the amino acid functional groups. N-Substituted NCAs, such as sulfenamide derivatives have also been examined. The ring-opening polymerization of NCAs is catalyzed by metal catalysts.

The polymerization of NCA’s have been considered as a prebiotic route to polypeptides.

Further reading

See also 
 Dakin–West reaction
 Glycine N-carboxyanhydride, the parent NCA

References 

Organic chemistry
Organic reactions